Stary Młyn  is a settlement in the administrative district of Gmina Prabuty, within Kwidzyn County, Pomeranian Voivodeship, in northern Poland.

For the history of the region, see History of Pomerania.

References

Villages in Kwidzyn County